The 2022 Campeones Cup was the fourth edition of the Campeones Cup, an annual North American football match contested between the reigning champion of  Major League Soccer and the winner of the Campeón de Campeones of Liga MX.

The match featured New York City FC, winners of the 2021 MLS Cup, and Atlas, the winners of the 2022 Campeón de Campeones. New York City FC hosted the match on September 14, 2022, at Yankee Stadium. NYCFC won 2–0 with goals from Alexander Callens and Maximiliano Moralez while starting several reserve players. They became the third consecutive MLS team to win the Campeones Cup.

Match

Details

Notes

References

2022
2022 in American soccer
2022–23 in Mexican football
2022 in sports in New York City
September 2022 sports events in the United States
Atlas F.C. matches
New York City FC matches